Assin Praso is a town in the Assin North Municipal District of the Central Region in Ghana

References

Populated places in the Central Region (Ghana)